Iodine oxides are chemical compounds of oxygen and iodine. Iodine has only two stable oxides which are isolatable in bulk, iodine tetroxide and iodine pentoxide, but a number of other oxides are formed in trace quantities or have been hypothesized to exist.
The chemistry of these compounds is complicated with only a few having been well characterized. Many have been detected in the atmosphere and are believed to be particularly important in the marine boundary layer.

Diiodine monoxide has largely been the subject of theoretical study, but there is some evidence that it may be prepared in a similar manner to dichlorine monoxide, via a reaction between HgO and I2. The compound appears to be highly unstable but can react with alkenes to give halogenated products.

Radical  iodine oxide (IO), iodine dioxide (IO2) and iodine tetroxide ((IO2)2) all possess significant and interconnected atmospheric chemistry. They are formed, in very small quantities, at the marine boundary layer by the photooxidation of diiodomethane, which is produced by macroalga such as seaweed or through the oxidation of molecular  iodine, produced by the reaction of gaseous ozone and iodide present at the seasurface. Despite the small quantities produced (typically below ppt) they are thought to be powerful ozone depletion agents.

Diiodine pentoxide (I2O5) is the anhydride of iodic acid and the only stable anhydride of an iodine oxoacid.

Tetraiodine nonoxide (I4O9) has been prepared by the gas-phase reaction of I2 with O3 but has not been extensively studied.

Iodate anions

Iodine oxides also form negatively charged anions, which (associated with complementary cations) are components of acids or salts.  These include the iodates and periodates.

Their conjugate acids are:

The -1 oxidation state, hydrogen iodide, is not an oxide, but it is included in this table for completeness.

The periodates include two variants: metaperiodate  and orthoperiodate .

See also
 Oxygen fluoride
 Chlorine oxide
 Bromine oxide

References

Oxides
Iodides
Iodine compounds